Kondratenko (Кондратéнко) is a Ukrainian surname. Notable people with the surname include:

 Anatoli Kondratenko (born 1949), Soviet football striker
 Anatoly Kondratenko (born 1935), Ukrainian theoretical physicist
 Kateryna Kondratenko (born 1978), Ukrainian singer
  (born 1999), Ukrainian singer and actress
 Nikolai Kondratenko (born 1940), Russian politician
 Roman Kondratenko (1857–1904), Russian general
 Vasiliy Kondratenko (born 1989), Russian bobsledder

See also
 

Ukrainian-language surnames